Zuleika Bazhbeuk-Melikyan (born 1939) is an Armenian painter. She is daughter to Alexander Bazhbeuk-Melikyan.

Biography 
Her work was shown at the Armenian National Gallery September 16, 2016 alongside her father and siblings in a show curated by Margarita Khachatryan. Her painting style continues in the tradition of the Tbilisi State Academy of Arts in Georgia and brought a new life to the fine art of the seventies. Her multilayered and pointillist method, incarnated with theatrical and romantic soul, express luminosity; They are both emotional and musical. She has been called a, "musician with a brush in her hand".

References

1939 births
Living people
Armenian painters
Armenian women painters
20th-century Armenian women artists
21st-century Armenian women artists